Tell El Hadeth is an archaeological site 14 km west southwest of Baalbek in the Beqaa Mohafazat (Governorate). It dates at least to the Neolithic or Chalcolithic.

References

Baalbek District
Bronze Age sites in Lebanon